Adrienne Arsht (born February 4, 1942) is an American businesswoman and philanthropist. She made a $30 million contribution to Miami-Dade County's Performing Arts Center, which was renamed the Adrienne Arsht Center. She is on the board of trustees of the John F. Kennedy Center.

Personal life and career
Arsht was born to a Jewish family in Wilmington, Delaware, the daughter of Samuel Arsht, a Wilmington attorney, and Roxana Cannon Arsht, the first female judge in the State of Delaware. Arsht skipped her senior year at Tower Hill School and went directly to Mount Holyoke College, where she received her bachelor's degree. She then attended the Villanova University School of Law for her J.D. Upon graduation, Arsht became the eleventh woman admitted to the Delaware bar. Her mother was the fifth.  She was married to the late Myer Feldman (1914–2007), a former counsel to Presidents John F. Kennedy and Lyndon B. Johnson.

Arsht began her Delaware law career in 1966 with the firm Morris, Nichols, Arsht & Tunnell. In 1969, she moved to New York City and joined the legal department of Trans World Airlines (TWA). She was the first woman to work in the airline industry's Property, Cargo and Government Relations departments. She moved to Washington, D.C. in 1979 where she initially worked with a law firm, then started her own title company before moving to Miami in 1996 to run her family-owned bank, TotalBank.

From 1996 to 2007, Arsht served as Chairman of the Board of TotalBank. In that time, TotalBank grew from four locations to 14 with over $1.4 billion in assets. In November 2007, she sold the bank to Banco Popular Español for $300 million and was named Chairman Emerita of TotalBank.

Philanthropic work
Arsht gave a $30 million contribution to Miami's Performing Arts Center in 2008. Subsequently, the former Carnival Center for the Performing Arts was renamed "The Adrienne Arsht Center for the Performing Arts of Miami-Dade County", or the Arsht Center for short. She is Founding Chairman of the Adrienne Arsht Center Foundation. In Miami, Arsht is also a member of the board and Trustee Emerita of the University of Miami, as well as a board member for the non-profit organization, Amigos For Kids. In January 2009, The Chronicle of Philanthropy ranked Arsht number 39 on its 2008 America's 50 biggest donors list.

In 2004, Arsht became the first woman to join the Million Dollar Roundtable of United Way of Miami-Dade County. In October 2008, Arsht committed more than $6 million to the University of Miami to support the university-wide Arsht Ethics Programs, assist the Bascom Palmer Eye Institute of the University of Miami and support other University of Miami initiatives.

In Washington, D.C., she serves on the board of trustees of the John F. Kennedy Center for the Performing Arts. In 2013, she endowed the Adrienne Arsht Latin American Center at The Atlantic Council to focus on the role of South America in the trans-Atlantic world. In 2009, Arsht co-funded the program “Arts in Crisis: A Kennedy Center Initiative,” which provided planning assistance and consulting services to struggling arts organizations throughout the United States. She donated $5 million to establish the Adrienne Arsht Musical Theater Fund at the Kennedy Center to support a wide variety of musical theater productions.

Arsht is Executive Vice Chairman of the Atlantic Council, and former Vice Chairman member of the board of the Lincoln Center for the Performing Arts. Arsht is a member of National Advisory Board of the Sandra Day O’Connor Institute for American Democracy and Blair House Restoration Fund. She is a member of the Fine Arts Committee of the U.S. State Department, the Council on Foreign Relations, and is former President of the Vice President's Residence Foundation.

In 2004, after the death of her parents, Arsht created the Arsht-Cannon Fund through the Delaware Community Foundation. Since its creation, the Arsht-Cannon Fund has given $4.5 million to non-profit organizations in Delaware, which have been specifically attributed to programs centered on the needs of Hispanic families. In May 2010, under Arsht's direction, the fund pledged $300,000 over three years to bring the Nemours Foundation BrightStart! Dyslexia Initiative to Delaware. The program is aimed at improving the reading and writing skills of young children and identifying those with learning disabilities at an early age.

In 2005, Arsht announced a $2 million gift to Goucher College in Maryland, creating the Roxana Cannon Arsht Center for Ethics and Leadership, in honor of her late mother, a Goucher graduate.

In February 2009, Arsht funded the creation of the Best Buddies Delaware chapter to specifically serve Hispanics and African-Americans with mental disabilities.

In October 2012 stage in Alice Tully Hall at Lincoln Center was dedicated to Arsht for her $10 million contribution in support of the transformation of Lincoln Center's facilities and public spaces.

In 2016, Arsht founded the Adrienne Arsht Center for Resilience at the Atlantic Council. The center's goal is advancing approaches that promote the abilities of nations, cities, communities, and individuals to respond effectively to disruptions, understand and manage complex interdependent systems, and thrive in today's global environment.

Arsht was the first woman to receive the Carnegie Hall Medal of Excellence in June, 2017. The award recognizes Ms. Arsht's philanthropy to cultural and nonprofit institutions throughout the United States, as well as leadership in the financial, public, and legal sectors. Arsht was the ninth recipient of the Medal of Excellence. Previous recipients have included Sanford I. Weill, Oscar de la Renta, Robert K. Kraft, Bill Cunningham, Henry T. Segerstrom, Terry J. Lundgren, Richard S. Fuld, Jr., and Kenneth D. Lewis.

In 2019, Arsht, who serves as executive vice-chair of the Atlantic Council, was awarded the Distinguished Service Award at the Atlantic Council's annual Distinguished Leadership Awards dinner for her philanthropic work. Arsht has committed $25 million to permanently endow the Adrienne Arsht Center for Resilience at the Atlantic Council. Partnered with a $30 million donation from the Rockefeller Foundation, the center will now be named the Adrienne Arsht-Rockefeller Foundation Resilience Center (Arsht-Rock), succeeding 100 Resilient Cities (100RC).

References

External links
 
 The Adrienne Arsht Center for the Performing Arts of Miami-Dade County
 The Adrienne Arsht Center for the Performing Arts of Miami-Dade County Facebook Page

American women philanthropists
1942 births
Living people
Mount Holyoke College alumni
Villanova University School of Law alumni
Jewish American philanthropists
Delaware lawyers
New York (state) lawyers
Tower Hill School alumni
Atlantic Council
Philanthropists from Delaware
Philanthropists from Florida
Businesspeople from Wilmington, Delaware
Businesspeople from Miami
20th-century American businesspeople
20th-century American businesswomen
21st-century American businesspeople
21st-century American businesswomen
20th-century American lawyers
21st-century philanthropists
20th-century American women lawyers
21st-century American Jews
21st-century women philanthropists